Ngankam Jessic Gaïtan Ngankam (born 20 July 2000) is a German professional footballer who plays as a forward for  club Hertha BSC.

Club career
Ngankam made his professional debut for Hertha BSC on 16 May 2020 in the Bundesliga, coming on as a substitute in the 79th minute for Vedad Ibišević in the away match against 1899 Hoffenheim, which finished as a 3–0 win.

He moved Greuther Fürth in July 2021 on a season-long loan. Greuther Fürth secured an option to sign him permanently.

On 31 May 2022, Ngankam returned to Hertha BSC and signed a contract extension to 2025.

International career
Ngankam was included in Germany's squad for the 2017 FIFA U-17 World Cup in India. He made four appearances during the tournament, in which Germany were eliminated in the quarter-finals with a 2–1 loss against Brazil. The following year, he made three appearances for the under-18 national team.

Personal life
Ngankam was born in Berlin, and is of Cameroonian descent. His brother Roussel is also a footballer, and appeared for the Germany youth national teams.

References

External links
 Profile at the Hertha BSC website
 
 
 
 
 

2000 births
Living people
Footballers from Berlin
German footballers
German people of Cameroonian descent
German sportspeople of African descent
Association football forwards
Germany youth international footballers
Hertha BSC II players
Hertha BSC players
SpVgg Greuther Fürth players
Bundesliga players
Regionalliga players